The Romania women's futsal team is the national women's futsal team of Romania and is governed by the Romanian Football Federation. 
Its first two games were in August 2018 against neighboring Moldova, a draw and a win. 
It first played an official match in the UEFA Women's Futsal Euro 2019 qualifications, Main round, Group 1, where it lost all matches. The team did not play any matches in 2019 or 2020, and it was the only national team that did not enter the UEFA Women's Futsal Euro 2021  qualifications (later rescheduled as UEFA Women's Futsal Euro 2022), despite doing so for the previous edition. The team did not return for UEFA Women's Futsal Euro 2023 qualifications either.

UEFA Women's Futsal Championship

Results at official competitions
Friendly matches are not included.

Results and fixtures

2018

Squads
The squad called up for training and EURO qualifiers played in 2018 consisted of 14 players.

Coach:  David Asandei

 (futsal)
 (football)

 (football)
 (football)
 (football)
 (football)
 (futsal)
 (football)
 (youth futsal)
 (football)
 (football)
 (football)
 (football)
 (football)

References

External links
Official website
FIFA profile

F
European women's national futsal teams